Daði  is an Icelandic masculine given name that may refer to the following notable people:
 Daði Freyr (born 1992), Icelandic musician, also known as "Daði"
 Daði Guðmundsson (c.1495–1563), Icelandic farmer and magistrate
 Daði Lár Jónsson (born 1996), Icelandic sprinter and basketball player
 Daði Lárusson (born 1973), Icelandic football goalkeeper
 Janus Daði Smárason (born 1995), Icelandic handball player
 Jón Daði Böðvarsson (born 1992), Icelandic football player

See also
 Dadi (disambiguation)

Icelandic masculine given names